Sarmi Yashy Kabul FC  is a football team in Afghanistan. They play in the Premier League.

Managers

Current squad

Achievements

References

Football clubs in Afghanistan
Sport in Kabul
1990 establishments in Afghanistan
Association football clubs established in 1990